Lotte from Gadgetville is a 2006 Estonian/Latvian feature-length animated film directed by Heiki Ernits and Janno Põldma.

The film's characters first appeared in Lotte reis lõunamaale (Lotte Goes South), an Estonian animated TV series consisting of 13 five-minute episodes.

In 2007, the film was awarded the Latvian Film Prize for best animated feature film.

In 2011, a sequel was released - Lotte and the Moonstone Secret.

The films and their characters proved so popular in their homeland, that a theme park, Lottemaa (Lotte Village Theme Park), opened in Reiu, Häädemeeste Parish, Estonia.

Cast

Evelin Pang as Lotte
Andero Ermel as Bruno  
Argo Aadli as Albert/Theodor   
Lembit Ulfsak as Oskar  
Garmen Tabor as Anna  
Marko Matvere as Mati 
Piret Kalda as Paula 
Peeter Oja as Adalbert 
Harriet Toompere as Sophie 
Elina Reinold as Susumu 
Mait Malmsten as Jaak 
Margus Tabor as Klaus 
Aarne Üksküla as James 
Peeter Tammearu as John 
Anne Reemann as Helmi
Ain Lutsepp as Eduard 
Tõnu Kark as Bruno, chief of jury 
Tõnu Oja as Giovanni 
Anu Lamp as Julia 
Tiit Sukk as Väino/Radio wave 
Roman Baskin as Judo judge

References

External links 
 
 Lottemaa - Lotte Village Theme Park English Homepage

2006 films
2006 animated films
Latvian animated films
Estonian animated films
Estonian-language films
Estonian children's films